Little Valley may refer to:
Little Valley, California
Little Valley Township, McPherson County, Kansas
Little Valley, New York
Little Valley (town), New York
Little Valley (village), New York